Darren Alfred (born 28 August 1996) is a Trinidad and Tobago track and field athlete who specializes in middle-distance running. He represented Trinidad and Tobago at the 2019 World Athletics Championships, competing in men's 4 × 400 metres relay.

References

Trinidad and Tobago male middle-distance runners
1996 births
Living people
World Athletics Championships athletes for Trinidad and Tobago